Tiger Woods PGA Tour 2005 is a sports video game developed by EA Redwood Shores for the GameCube, Xbox and PlayStation 2 versions, Headgate Studios for the Microsoft Windows and Mac OS X versions, Sensory Sweep Studios for the Nintendo DS version and EA Canada for the PlayStation Portable version and published by EA Sports for GameCube, Microsoft Windows, Xbox, PlayStation 2, Nintendo DS, PlayStation Portable and Mac OS X. An N-Gage version was planned but never released.

Reception

Tiger Woods PGA Tour 2005 received "generally favorable" reviews on all platforms except the PC version, which received "universal acclaim" and the DS version, which received "mixed or average" reviews, according to video game review aggregator Metacritic.

References

External links
 
 
 

2004 video games
Cancelled N-Gage games
EA Sports games
GameCube games
Golf video games
Tiger Woods video games
Interactive Achievement Award winners
Nintendo DS games
MacOS games
PlayStation 2 games
PlayStation Portable games
Sports video games set in the United States
Video games developed in the United States
Video games scored by BT (musician)
Video games set in South Africa
Video games set in the United Kingdom
Windows games
Xbox games
D.I.C.E. Award for Sports Game of the Year winners
Sensory Sweep Studios games
Multiplayer and single-player video games